The Guardhouse is located in the Livingston Range, Glacier National Park in the U.S. state of Montana. The Guardhouse is situated on the Continental Divide.

Geology

Like other mountains in Glacier National Park, the peak is composed of sedimentary rock laid down during the Precambrian to Jurassic periods.

Climate
Based on the Köppen climate classification, the peak is located in an alpine subarctic climate zone with long, cold, snowy winters, and cool to warm summers. Temperatures can drop below −10 °F with wind chill factors below −30 °F.

See also
 List of mountains and mountain ranges of Glacier National Park (U.S.)

References

Livingston Range
Mountains of Flathead County, Montana
Mountains of Glacier County, Montana
Mountains of Glacier National Park (U.S.)
Mountains of Montana